John Sewell Sanborn (January 1, 1819 – July 17, 1877) was a Canadian educator, lawyer, judge and political figure. Some sources give his middle name as Sewall.

He was born in Gilmanton, New Hampshire and graduated from Dartmouth College, later studying at the University of Bishop's College in Lennoxville, Quebec. He was the principal at a secondary school in Sherbrooke. He later articled in law and was called to the bar in 1847.

He was elected to the 3rd Parliament of the Province of Canada representing Sherbrooke County in a by-election in March 1850. At the time, he supported annexation of the Eastern Townships with the United States. He was re-elected in 1851, no longer supporting annexation. The annexation issue had played an important role in establishing a rail link connecting the region to Maine. In 1854, he was elected in Compton. In 1863, he was acclaimed to the Legislative Council for Wellington division and he was re-elected in 1864. He supported an elected Senate in the discussions leading up to Confederation. In 1867, he was appointed to the new Senate of Canada. In 1872, he was appointed to the Quebec Superior Court for Saint-François district and he was appointed to the Court of Queen's Bench at Montreal in 1874.

He died at Asbury Park, New Jersey in 1877.

References
 
 
 

1819 births
1877 deaths
American emigrants to pre-Confederation Quebec
Bishop's University alumni
Canadian senators from Quebec
Dartmouth College alumni
Liberal Party of Canada senators
Members of the Legislative Assembly of the Province of Canada from Canada East
Members of the Legislative Council of the Province of Canada
People from Gilmanton, New Hampshire
Judges in Quebec
Anglophone Quebec people